Jonathan Hansler is an English  actor. He has worked in theatre, film and television.

Career

Television
Hansler's television roles include the aristocrat Colin Tennant in the 2005 TV movie The Queen's Sister, Mr Pelham in the BBC drama series Hotel Babylon and the announcer in the sitcom My Family.

Hansler played radio journalist Pete Clifford in EastEnders in September 2018.

Theatre
Hansler's played the character of Lance in the 2007 revival of Toast with the Hull Truck Theatre and also Hugh Paddick in the 50th Anniversary tour of Round the Horne. In 2016, Hansler appeared in the West End production of Stephen Jeffreys' play The Libertine with Dominic Cooper, which opened at the Theatre Royal Haymarket after a short run at the Theatre Royal Bath. In 2017, Hansler appeared as General Tilney in an adaptation of Jane Austen's Northanger Abbey with the Theatre Royal, Bury St Edmunds, which toured the UK.

From 2017 to 2018, Hansler played both Captain Hook and Mr. Darling in the Theatre Royal Winchester's production of Peter Pan, for which he received critical acclaim.

In 2021 He led the re-opening of the White Bear Theatre playing George Sanders in Vilain in Tinseltown by David Harrold.

Other work
Hansler provided the voice of Lucius Malfoy and other characters in three of the Harry Potter video games; Harry Potter and the Order of the Phoenix, Harry Potter and the Half-Blood Prince and Harry Potter and the Deathly Hallows – Part 1.

Hansler played the lead character in a 2013 advertising campaign for Cadbury.

Filmography

References

External links
 

British male actors
Living people
English male actors
English male film actors
20th-century English male actors
21st-century English male actors
English male stage actors
English male television actors
Year of birth missing (living people)